The relations between the Russian Empire and the United States (1776–1917) predate the Soviet Russia/Soviet Union–United States relations (1917–1991) and the modern Russia–United States relations (1991–present). Russia officially recognized the United States in 1803, and the two countries established diplomatic relations in 1809.

Country comparison

Leaders of the Russian Empire and the United States from 1800 to 1917.

Russian involvement in the American Revolutionary War

Relations between the two countries began in 1776, when the United States declared its independence from Great Britain.

Earlier contacts had occurred. In 1763, a Boston] merchant had anchored his ship at the port of Kronstadt after a direct transatlantic voyage.

Despite being geographically removed from the American scene, Russia under Catherine the Great significantly affected the American Revolution through diplomacy. While Catherine personally oversaw most Russian interactions with the new country, she also entrusted certain tasks to her foreign advisor, Nikita Ivanovich Panin, who often acted on Catherine's behalf when it came to matters of international diplomacy.  Catherine and Panin interacted with the British government through James Harris, 1st Earl of Malmesbury, at the Russian court.  The decisions made by Catherine and Panin during the Revolution to remain officially neutral, refuse Britain's requests for military assistance, and insist on peace talks that linked a resolution of the American Revolution with the settlement of separate European conflicts indirectly helped the Americans win the Revolution and gain independence.

Russian-American trade
Small scale direct trade between Russia and the colonies began as early as 1763. Such trade was a violation of Britain's Navigation Acts, which allowed the Thirteen Colonies to trade only with Britain. Russian products such as hemp, sail linen and iron had started arriving in colonial ports years before the American Revolutionary War began and did not stop when the war started. America and Russia saw each other as trading partners.

Throughout the Revolutionary War, Catherine believed an independent American nation would be ideal for Russian business interests. While some Russian leaders worried that an independent America might interfere with Russia's trade with other European nations, Catherine saw direct Russian-American trade as an excellent opportunity to expand commerce. Catherine knew that after the war, a free America could trade directly with Russia without interference. Moreover, if the Americans gained their freedom, Britain would have to turn to other countries such as Russia to supply it with the resources that could no longer be simply extracted from America.

Neutrality
Catherine chose to have Russia remain officially neutral during the Revolution and never openly picked sides during the war. On an unofficial basis, however, she acted favorably towards the American colonists by offering to provide them all that she could without compromising Russia's neutrality and her eventual desire to act as a mediator.

In March 1780, the Russian ministry released a "Declaration of Armed Neutrality." That set out Russia's international stance on the American Revolution and focused on the importance of allowing neutral vessels to travel freely to any Russian port without them being searched or harassed by the Navigation Acts. While the declaration kept Russia officially neutral, it supported many of France's own pro-American policies and resisted Britain's efforts to strangle America through a naval blockade. The declaration also gave the American rebels an emotional lift, as they realized Russia was not solidly aligned with Britain. With Russia as a potential, powerful friend, Russian-American connections and communications continued to improve. Nevertheless, Catherine refused to recognize the United States openly as an independent nation until the war had ended.

Britain's requests for assistance
As the Revolutionary War continued into the late 1770s, a growing list of European powers took sides against Britain. The British saw a need to solidify an alliance with Russia to bolster its American war. As a world power that had allied with Britain, Russia was an obvious choice to assist with logistical and military support, as well as diplomatic efforts.

While Catherine seems to have admired the British people and culture, she disliked George III and his ministry. She was particularly disturbed by the Seven Years' War during which Catherine observed Britain's efforts to exit the conflict discreetly and to leave Russia's ally Prussia vulnerable to defeat. She considered those efforts immoral and disloyal and saw Britain as an unreliable ally. She also viewed the American Revolution as Britain's fault. Citing the constant change in Britain's ministries as a major reason, Catherine understood the American grievances.

Despite Russia's official neutrality, Catherine's negative opinions of British rule and her view that Britain had caused the revolution weighed on her decisions when Britain began to request Russian support.
In the summer of 1775, Britain sent diplomats to Russia in an attempt to learn whether Catherine would agree to send troops to America to aid British forces. Although her initial response seemed positive, Catherine denied George's formal request for support. While her dislike of the British ministry likely influenced her decision, Catherine formally cited the fact that her army needed rest after it had just finished more than six years of war.

In November 1779, Britain made another plea for Russian assistance. Swallowing their pride, the British acknowledged to Catherine the collective power of Britain's enemies, as well as the King's desire for peace. The British letter to Catherine explained those concerns and offered to "commit her Britain's interests to the hand of the Empress." The British included a specific request for Russia to use force against all British enemies, including other European countries, to stop the American Revolution. After waiting several months, Catherine decided to refuse Britain's request.

In 1781, Britain attempted to bribe Russia to gain its assistance. Distressed and realizing that the British were close to losing the war, James Harris asked if a piece of British territory could convince Russia to join the fight. Offering the island of Minorca, Harris did not request soldiers in exchange. This time, Britain simply asked for Russia to convince France to exit the war and to force the American rebels to fight alone.  Perhaps revealing her secret desire to have the Americans gain their independence, Catherine used Harris's proposal to embarrass Britain. She declined Harris's offer and published Britain's attempts at bribery to the French and the Spanish.

Attempt at peacemaking
Catherine played a significant role in peacemaking efforts during the Revolutionary War. In October 1780, she sent a proposal to each of the European powers involved in the conflict. The proposal requested for the countries to meet to discuss what could be done to create peace. The powers met in Vienna after Britain requested for the Austrian ministry to co-mediate the peace talks. Catherine sent Prince Dimitri Galitzin to act on her behalf as the Russian mediator. She sent him with a proposed set of peace guidelines that included a multi-year armistice between the countries and a requirement for negotiations between Britain and its European enemies as well as between Britain and America. Catherine chose not to include a proposal concerning whether America would become autonomous. Since the British would not accept American independence, and the French would not accept anything short of it, Catherine realized that explicitly providing for either outcome would lead to an immediate breakdown in the talks.  Catherine's ambiguous negotiation efforts ultimately fell through.

19th century
In 1801 Thomas Jefferson appointed Levett Harris as the first American consul-general to Russia (1803–1816). Russia attempted to join as a third-party mediator of peace in the British–American War of 1812, but this idea was rejected by the United Kingdom.

The Monroe Doctrine was partly aimed at Holy Alliance support of intervention in Latin America which Russia several times tried to get the United States to join, as well as the Ukase of 1821 banning non-Russian ships from the Northwest Coast. The Russo-American Treaty of 1824 set parallel 54°40′ north as the boundary between Russian America and the Anglo-American Oregon Country.

American Civil War

During the American Civil War, Russia supported the Union, largely because it believed that the U.S. served as a counterbalance to its geopolitical rival, the United Kingdom. In 1863, the Russian Navy's Baltic and Pacific fleets wintered in the American ports of New York and San Francisco, respectively. The Alexander Nevsky and the other vessels of the Atlantic squadron stayed in American waters for seven months (September 1863 to June 1864).

1865 saw a major project attempted: the building of a Russian-American telegraph line from Seattle, through British Columbia, Russian America (Alaska) and Siberia. An early attempt to link East-West communications, it failed and never operated.

Alaska purchase, 1867

Russia operated a small fur-trade operations in Alaska, coupled with missionaries to the natives. By 1861, the project had lost money, threatened to antagonize the Americans, and could not be defended from Britain. It proved practically impossible to entice Russians to permanently migrate to Alaska; only a few hundred were there in 1867. In the Alaska Purchase of 1867, the land was sold to the United States for $7.2 million.

The Russian administrators and military left Alaska, but some missionaries stayed on to minister to the many natives who converted to the Russian Orthodox faith.

1880–1918

From 1880 to 1917, about 3.2 million immigrants arrived in the U.S. from the Russian Empire. Most were Jews or Poles, and only 100,000 were ethnic Russians. There were many Volga Germans or Russian German immigrants to the United States. Meanwhile large numbers of minorities, especially Jews, Poles, and Lithuanians, emigrated to the United States before 1914. Relations remained cool, especially because of the repeated pogroms in the Russian Empire.

Pogroms and aftermath
After 1880, repeated anti-Jewish pogroms in Russia alienated American elite and public opinion. In 1903, the Kishinev pogrom killed 47 Jews, injured 400, and left 10,000 homeless and dependent on relief. American Jews began large-scale organized financial help and assisted in emigration.  More violence in Russia led in 1911 to the United States repealing an 1832 commercial treaty.

Boxer Rebellion

In 1900, Russia and America were part of the Eight-Nation Alliance suppressing the Boxer Rebellion in China. Russia soon afterward occupied Manchuria, and the United States asserted the Open Door Policy to forestall Russian and German territorial demands from leading to a partition of China into various colonies.

Wars
President Theodore Roosevelt played a major role in ending the Russo-Japanese War. During the war, Roosevelt had tacitly supported Japan. The Treaty of Portsmouth was signed in 1905 on the conditions favorable to the Russians. Roosevelt subsequently received the Nobel Peace Prize for his efforts in mediation.

During World War I, the United States declaration of war on Germany (1917) came after Nicholas II had abdicated as a result of the February Revolution. When the Tsar was still in power, some Americans resisted fighting a war with him as an ally. With him gone, the Wilson administration used the new provisional government to describe how the democratic nations were fighting against autocratic old empires of Germany and Austria-Hungary. During the war, the American Expeditionary Forces were just starting to see battle when the October Revolution happened in which the Bolsheviks overthrew the Russian Provisional Government in Petrograd and removed Russia from the war.

Before the armistice in November 1918, the Americans had helped the Allied intervention in the Russian Civil War with the Polar Bear Expedition and the American Expeditionary Force Siberia. The Americans' goal was not necessarily ideological but rather to prevent the German enemy from gaining access to war supplies controlled by the Bolsheviks, though the United States also tacitly supported the White movement against the Bolsheviks.

References

Further reading
 Bailey, Thomas A. America Faces Russia: Russian-American Relations from Early Times to Our Day (1950). online
 Bashkina, Nina N; and David F.  Trask, eds. The United States and Russia : the beginning of relations, 1765-1815 (1980), 1260pp online  primary sources
 Bolkhovitinov, Nikolai N. The Beginnings of Russian-American Relations, 1775-1815. (Harvard University Press, 1975).
 Dulles, Foster Rhea. The road to Teheran: the story of Russia and America, 1781-1943 (1945) online
 Fremon, David K. The Alaska Purchase in American history  (1999) for secondary schools online
 Golder, Frank A. "The American Civil War Through the Eyes of A Russian Diplomat" American Historical Review 26#3 (1921), pp. 454–463 online, about ambassador Stoeckl
 Jensen, Oliver, ed. America and Russia - A Century and a Half of Dramatic Encounters (1962) 12 popular essays by experts published in American Heritage magazine online
 Jensen, Ronald J. The Alaska Purchase and Russian-American Relations (1973).
 Kolchin, Peter. Unfree labor: American slavery and Russian serfdom (1987) online 
 Saul, Norman E. Distant Friends: The United States and Russia, 1763-1867 (1991)
 Saul, Norman E. Concord and Conflict: The United States and Russia, 1867-1914 (1996)
 Saul, Norman E. The A to Z of United States-Russian/Soviet Relations (2010)
 Saul, Norman E. Historical Dictionary of Russian and Soviet Foreign Policy (2014).
 Trani, Eugene P. "Woodrow Wilson and the decision to intervene in Russia: a reconsideration." Journal of Modern History 48.3 (1976): 440-461. online

See also

 Foreign policy of the Russian Empire
 History of United States foreign policy
 Soviet Union–United States relations
 Russia–United States relations
 United States Ambassador to Russia

 
United States
Russian Empire
Foreign relations during the American Civil War